Marcel Melicherčík (born December 20, 1986) is a Slovak professional ice hockey goaltender who currently plays for HK Spišská Nová Ves of the Slovak Extraliga.

Career
He first played professionally in his native land with HK Poprad in the Slovak Extraliga during the 2006–07 season. Melicherčík previously played for HC Bílí Tygři Liberec of the Czech Extraliga (ELH).

Career statistics

Regular season and playoffs

References

External links

 

1986 births
Living people
Sportspeople from Poprad
Slovak ice hockey goaltenders
HK Poprad players
MHK Kežmarok players
HC Lev Praha players
HC Sparta Praha players
HC Stadion Litoměřice players
HC Bílí Tygři Liberec players
HC Benátky nad Jizerou players
HC Košice players
Bolzano HC players
Heilbronner Falken players
Kassel Huskies players
Grizzlys Wolfsburg players
HC '05 Banská Bystrica players
HK Spišská Nová Ves players
Slovak expatriate ice hockey players in the Czech Republic
Slovak expatriate ice hockey players in Germany
Slovak expatriate sportspeople in Italy
Expatriate ice hockey players in Italy